Godičevo is small settlement northeast of Nova Vas in the Municipality of Bloke in the Inner Carniola region of Slovenia. It has six residents.

References

External links

Godičevo on Geopedia

Populated places in the Municipality of Bloke